Lako is a surname and given name. Notable people with this name include:

Surname
 Bujar Lako (1946–2016), Albanian actor
 Fabiano Lako, South Sudanese football player
 Ladule Lako LoSarah (born 1987), South Sudanese football player and coach
 Natasha Lako (born 1948), Albanian author

Given name
 Lako Bodra (1919–1986)
 Lako Bukia, Georgian fashion designer
 Lako Phuti Bhutia (born 1994), Indian football player

See also
 Korçë Airfield, Albania (ICAO code LAKO)